Mihaela Armășescu (born 3 September 1963) is a retired Romanian rower. She competed in various events at the 1984 and 1988 Olympics and four world championships between 1982 and 1989 and won seven medals, including two Olympic silver medals in the eights.

References

External links 
 
 
 
 

1963 births
Living people
People from Vâlcea County
Romanian female rowers
Rowers at the 1984 Summer Olympics
Rowers at the 1988 Summer Olympics
Olympic rowers of Romania
Olympic silver medalists for Romania
Olympic medalists in rowing
Medalists at the 1988 Summer Olympics
Medalists at the 1984 Summer Olympics
World Rowing Championships medalists for Romania
20th-century Romanian women